Ackermannviridae is a family of viruses in the order Caudovirales. Gammaproteobacteria in the phylum Pseudomonadota serve as natural hosts. There are 2 subfamilies, 10 genera, and 63 species in the family.

Etymology
The family's name, Ackermann is in honor of Hans-Wolfgang Ackermann (1936-2017), a German microbiologist, the suffix -viridae is the standard suffix for virus families.

Taxonomy
The following taxa are recognized (-virinae denotes subfamily and -virus denotes genus):
 Aglimvirinae
 Agtrevirus
 Limestonevirus
 Cvivirinae
 Kuttervirus

incertae sedis genera:
 Campanilevirus
 Kujavirus
 Miltonvirus
 Nezavisimistyvirus
 Taipeivirus
 Tedavirus
 Vapseptimavirus

References

External links
 ViralZone
 

Caudovirales
Virus families